Mongchontoseong Station is a railway station on Line 8 of the Seoul Metropolitan Subway. Its station subname is World Peace Gate, where said location is nearby.

Station layout

Railway stations in South Korea opened in 1999
Seoul Metropolitan Subway stations
Metro stations in Songpa District